Bunu is a Hmongic language of southern China.

Varieties
Meng (2001) lists the following language varieties for Bunu.

Bunu 布努 (Pu Nu) - 359,474 speakers; representative dialect: Nongjing, Qibainong Township, Dahua County 大化七百弄乡弄京
Dongnu 东努 (Tung Nu,) - 293,489 speakers in Funing County, Yunnan (in Longshao 龙绍, etc.) and northern Guangxi: Du'an (in Meizhu 梅珠, etc.), Dahua, Bama, Pingguo, Tiandong, Mashan, Debao, Long'an, Baise, Tianyang, Donglan, Hechi, Shanglin, Xincheng, Yishan, Laibin. In Funing County, they are known as Buzha 布咋 (their autonym) or the Mountain Yao 山瑶.
Nunu 努努 (Nu Nu,) - 53,870 speakers in northwestern Guangxi: Lingyun (in Taohua 陶化, etc.), Fengshan, Donglan, Bama (in Xishan 西山, etc.), Tianlin, Leye
Bunuo 布诺 (Pu No,) - 12,115 speakers in Du'an (in Sanzhiyang 三只羊; Longma 龙麻 of Xia'ao 下坳乡, etc.), Guangxi

The Shaoyang Prefecture Gazetteer (1997:533) reports that the Miao of Xinning County, Hunan, speak a Bunu-branch language.

Others
The following may be alternative names for speakers of Bunu languages.
Beidalao 北大老: 15,000 (1990) in Rong'an County and Rongshui County, Guangxi; probably Bunu, though divergent
Changpao 长袍: 5,000 (1999) in southern Guizhou; undetermined linguistic affiliation, but could possibly be Bunu. Identified as Dongmeng by Bradley (2007).
Youmai 优迈: 2,000 (1999) in southwestern Guizhou; possibly a Bunu variety; classified as Pingtang Miao by Li Yunbing (2000)

References

West Hmongic languages
Languages of China